The 2018 Split district elections were held on 17 June 2018 for the councils of 34 city districts and local committees of Split. The Croatian Democratic Union won 122 council seats, while the Social Democratic Party of Croatia won 42 seats in coalition with the New Left party.

Results

See also
2017 Split local elections

References 

Split district 2018
Split district 
Split, Croatia
History of Split, Croatia